Achatinella dimorpha is a (presumed extinct) species of air-breathing land snail, a terrestrial pulmonate gastropod mollusk in the family Achatinellidae. This species was present in Oahu, but has not been seen since 1967, or perhaps earlier.

References

External links

dimorpha
Extinct gastropods
Taxonomy articles created by Polbot
ESA endangered species